"Love Runs Out" is a song recorded by American pop rock band OneRepublic for the 2014 reissue of their third studio album Native (2013). It was produced by Ryan Tedder, who co-wrote the song with Brent Kutzle, Drew Brown, Zach Filkins, and Eddie Fisher. The song was digitally released in Australia on April 14, 2014, and was serviced to contemporary hit radio in the United States on May 6 as the fourth overall single from the album.

Background and composition
"Love Runs Out" was originally intended to be the first single from Native, but was eventually passed over in favour of "If I Lose Myself". Tedder told Capital FM, "We have a new single that's not even on the album that's about to drop. I can't quote the date," and "I wanted ["Love Runs Out"] to be the first single, a few of us in the band did, but I could not finish the chorus. And you can't have a song without a chorus."

According to the sheet music published at Musicnotes.com by Sony/ATV Music Publishing, "Love Runs Out" is written in the key of G minor with a moderate tempo of 120 beats per minute. Tedder's vocals span from D3 to D5 in the song.

Critical reception
4Music called "Love Runs Out" a "spine-tingling track" with "slick production" and a "stomper".

Commercial performance
"Love Runs Out" debuted at number 81 on the Billboard Hot 100 and at number 22 on the New Zealand Singles Chart. The song eventually reached a peak of number 15 on the Hot 100. It reached its million sales mark in the US in August 2014 and by the end of 2014 had sold 1.4 million copies.

The song charted even higher in other countries. It reached the top 5 in Austria, Luxembourg, Canada, Germany and the UK, as well as the top 10 in Spain and South Africa. Its success in Germany was also down to the fact that the TV station ZDF had selected it as its official anthem for the 2014 FIFA World Cup.

Music video
A music video was produced for the song and was directed by Sophie Muller. It cost the group $180,000. The video has references to Sade's video "Soldier of Love", also under Muller's direction. It has 177.93 million views as of February 11, 2023, and is OneRepublic's fifth most viewed music video.

In other media
"Love Runs Out" is one of the official theme songs for WWE's WrestleMania 35 event in 2019.

Track listing
Digital download
"Love Runs Out" – 3:44

CD single
"Love Runs Out" – 3:44
"Counting Stars" (Mico C remix edit) – 3:18

Digital download – Remixes
"Love Runs Out" (Passion Pit Remix) – 5:00
"Love Runs Out" (Grabbitz Remix) – 3:19
"Love Runs Out" (Disciples Remix) – 4:59

Credits and personnel
Credits adapted from the liner notes of Native.

Locations
Recorded at Studio Faust Records, Prague, Czech Republic; Studio Le Roy Amsterdam, Netherlands; Motorbass Studio, Paris, France; Metropolis Studio London, United Kingdom; Tritonus Studio Berlin, Germany
Mixed at MixStar Studios, Virginia Beach, Virginia

Personnel

Songwriting – Ryan Tedder, Brent Kutzle, Drew Brown, Zach Filkins, Eddie Fisher
Production – Ryan Tedder
Backing vocals – Bobbie Gordon, Brent Kutzle, Zach Filkins 
Bass – Brent Kutzle 
Drums – Eddie Fisher
Engineer – Gerd Krueger, Luke Oldham, Mikel Le Roy, Ryan Tedder, Benjamin McCulloch, Derek Saxenmeyer, Steve Walsh 
Engineering assistant – Aaron Ahmad, Sam Harper 
Guitar – Drew Brown, Ryan Tedder 
Mixing – Serban Ghenea 
Piano – Ryan Tedder 
Percussion – Zach Filkins
Additional programming – Ryan Tedder

Charts

Weekly charts

Year-end charts

Certifications

Release history

References 

2014 songs
2014 singles
OneRepublic songs
Songs written by Ryan Tedder
Mosley Music Group singles
Interscope Records singles
Song recordings produced by Ryan Tedder
Music videos directed by Sophie Muller
Songs written by Zach Filkins
Songs written by Brent Kutzle
Songs written by Eddie Fisher (drummer)
Number-one singles in Scotland